The  is a network of urban expressways serving the greater Hiroshima area in Japan. It is owned and managed by Hiroshima Expressway Public Corporation.

Routes

External links
 Hiroshima Expressway Public Corporation 

Expressways in Japan
Roads in Hiroshima Prefecture